Yaroslav Volodymyrovych Zherebukh (born July 14, 1993 in Lviv) is a Ukrainian-American chess Grandmaster (2009).

Career
In 2006, he was a member of the Ukrainian national youth team, which won the U-16 Chess Olympiad in Turkey. His biggest success so far has been his victory, in February 2010, of the colossal Cappelle-la-Grande Open in France, ahead of 82 Grandmasters and 61 International masters (652 players), with 7.5 points out of 9.

In 2010, Yaroslav scored 8/11 (7 wins, 2 losses, 2 draws) to win the Young Stars of the World tournament, held in Kirishi, Russia.

In the 2011 World Cup, held in Khanty-Mansiysk, he caused a sensation by eliminating two super-grandmasters, Pavel Eljanov and Shakhriyar Mamedyarov in the first and third rounds. Eventually he was knocked out by Czech super-GM David Navara.

In May 2015, Zherebukh switched his affiliation from Ukraine to the United States. In 2016 he qualified to compete in the 2017  U.S. Championship where he scored a notable win in the seventh round against world #3 and reigning US Champion Fabiano Caruana.

In 2020, Zherebukh won the Chicago Chess Center 3rd Jane Addams Memorial.

Zherebukh has stated that Akiba Rubinstein is his favourite chess player, "because of his perfect technique and very rich understanding of chess."

References

External links
 
 
 
 Yaroslav Zherebukh at Grandcoach.com

1993 births
Living people
Ukrainian chess players
Chess grandmasters
Sportspeople from Lviv